The J. Leo Fairbanks House is a historic house in Salt Lake City, Utah. It was built in 1908 for artist J. Leo Fairbanks, whose father was painter John Fairbanks and whose brother was sculptor Avard Fairbanks. The house was designed in the Colonial Revival architectural style, and it was used as an artist studio by Fairbanks, his father and brother. It has been listed on the National Register of Historic Places since April 26, 1984.

References

		
National Register of Historic Places in Salt Lake City
Colonial Revival architecture in Utah
Houses completed in 1908
1908 establishments in Utah